Mario Moya Palencia (14 June 1933 – 9 October 2006) was a Mexican politician affiliated with the Institutional Revolutionary Party (PRI). He served Secretary of the Interior in the cabinet of Presidents Gustavo Díaz Ordaz and Luis Echeverría.

Moya Palencia was born in Mexico City and received a bachelor's degree in law from the National Autonomous University of Mexico (UNAM), where he undertook some postgraduate studies in Mexican history. After working as a local barrister in the Mexican capital he joined the Institutional Revolutionary Party and climbed through the ranks of the Secretariat of the Interior (in Spanish: Secretaría de Gobernación), first as general director of cinematography (1964–1968), then as undersecretary of the Interior and finally as head of the Secretariat in the cabinet of president Luis Echeverría. In that capacity, his indictment on charges of genocide was sought by the Special Prosecutor for Crimes of the Past as one of the perpetrators of the 10 June 1971 Corpus Christi Massacre; the case was ultimately dismissed in 2005 in application of statutory limitations. His name was mentioned within the PRI as a possible candidate for the 1976 presidential election, but the nomination was instead awarded to José López Portillo.

Moya Palencia later served as ambassador to the United Nations (1985–1989), Cuba (1991–1993), and Italy; he also served as special envoy to Central America and the Caribbean for co-operation matters.

External links
 Mario Moya Palencia's profile at El Universal 
Mario Moya Palencia: Associated Press obituary

1933 births
2006 deaths
Mexican diplomats
Mexican Secretaries of the Interior
Institutional Revolutionary Party politicians
National Autonomous University of Mexico alumni
People from Mexico City